Hit Mix may refer to:

 Hit Mix (Prudence Liew album), 1988
 Hit Mix (Katy Garbi album), 2002 
 Hits Mix, 2003 album by Celia Cruz